Koikawa Station is the name of multiple train stations in Japan:

 Koikawa Station (Akita) (鯉川駅) in Akita Prefecture
 Koikawa Station (Yamanashi) (小井川駅) in Yamanashi Prefecture